Maria Landrock (1923–1992) was a German film and television actress.

Selected filmography
 Pedro Will Hang (1942)

References

Bibliography 
 Noack, Frank. Veit Harlan: The Life and Work of a Nazi Filmmaker. University Press of Kentucky, 2016.

External links 
 

1923 births
1992 deaths
German film actresses
German television actresses
Actresses from Berlin
People from Treptow-Köpenick